The 1969 Copa de las Americas (Cup of the Americas) was an artistic gymnastics tournament held in Mexico City, Mexico, July 12–15, 1969. The competition was a follow up to the North American Championships, held from 1964 until 1968, and changed its name from North American Championships to Cup of the Americas so that South American countries would be allowed to enter. At least one South American nation, Brazil, intended to compete, but eventually the event was attended only by North American nations.

Participating nations

Medalists

Artistic gymnastics

References

1969 in gymnastics
Pan American Gymnastics Championships
International gymnastics competitions hosted by Mexico
1969 in Mexican sports